The 1954–55 Hellenic Football League season was the second in the history of the Hellenic Football League, a football competition in England.

Clubs

The league featured 16 clubs which competed in the last season, along with two new clubs:
Kidlington
Rickmansworth Town

League table

References

External links
 Hellenic Football League

1954-55
H